The 2023 Philippine Golf Tour, titled as the 2023 ICTSI Philippine Golf Tour for sponsorship reasons, is the 15th season of the Philippine Golf Tour, the main professional golf tour in the Philippines since it was formed in 2009.

Schedule
The following table lists official events during the 2023 season.

Notes

References

Philippine Golf Tour
Philippine Golf Tour
Philippine Golf Tour